Botniavasan is a cross-country skiing event held around Vörå in Finland. The event was first held in 2006, and is held in February each year.

References 

2006 establishments in Finland
February sporting events
Recurring sporting events established in 2006
Skiing in Finland
Ski marathons
Sports competitions in Finland
Cross-country skiing competitions in Finland